Code letters or ship's call sign (or callsign) were a method of identifying ships before the introduction of modern navigation aids and today also. Later, with the introduction of radio, code letters were also used as radio call signs.

History

In 1857, the United Kingdom sponsored the Commercial Code of Signals for the Use of All Nations at Sea, which introduced four letter flag signal codes to identify individual ships. The first vessel to be reported in Lloyd's List by her letters was the Mallard (LDPN), off Deal, Kent whilst on a voyage from London to Calcutta, India. The Commercial Code of Signals, c. 1900, was modified to become the International Code of Signals. By the 1860s, individual ships were being allocated code letters in the United States and Europe. From 1874, code letters were recorded in Lloyd's Register as part of each individual vessel's entry in the register. Generally, code letters allocated to a ship remained with that ship, although there are known cases where new code letters have been allocated following a change of port of registry or owner. Code Letters were sometimes reallocated once a ship had been struck from the register, but no two ships bore the same code letters at the same time. With the introduction of radio for communications, code letters were used also as radio call signs.

Flags used
Code letters used the twenty-six flags that represent the letters of the alphabet, plus the ten flags that represent the digits 0 - 9 also have been used. The substitute flags have not been used for call signs.

Each flag has own name. If the ship's call sign is "3EJH2"  (Panama Flag) the seamen never say "Three E J H Two". They say "Three Echo Juliet Hotel Two" to avoid misunderstanding as every country seamen have own pronunciation of letters and during speech over radio letters can be inaudible.

If call sign has 4 characters, the first character or figure of ship's call signs means country code for the ships registered under this country flag. If call sign has 5 characters, the first two characters or figure plus character of ship's call signs means country code for the ships registered under this country flag. The variations 4 or 5 characters due to 36 characters (26 letters + 10 digits) are not enough for all countries. For or the Soviet Union was used character "U" as the first character in call signs: cargo ship Metallurg Anosov had call sign "USMW" . In case that the ship changes the flag she has to change call sign also. For example, the ship Heinrich Arp: Code Letters "RDWL" (1923-34)  were changed to Code Letters "DHKV" (1934-45)  and from 1946 once more to the Soviet Union Ship's call sign (unknown, but first character was "U").

If the ship is scrapped or sunk, usually after a long time her call sign can be given to another ship.

The last three characters of ship's call sign usually mean nothing, but one of them used as a code of the government Shipping Companies if the country has more than one Shipping companies.

Today, each sea-going ship must keep on board the book or computer's play-disk "List of Ship Stations and Maritime Mobile Service Identity Assignments" of ITU publication, fresh edition, where listed all sea-going ships and their call signs also. This book must be fresh due to renewal (new edition had place every some years). in this book (or disk) mentioned:
"Call sign formed from the international call sign series in accordance with Article 19, Section III of the Radio Regulations (RR). The sign = (equal) in this column indicates that the name of the ship is used to identify the station in radiotelephony."

Some canals or narrow places have special requirements for the vessels to hoist their call sign flags during the transit through the area. The Suez Canal was once such place where this requirement was made. Thanks to technological advances in the navigation abilities of marine craft, this action is no longer compulsory.

References

Law of the sea
Latin-script representations
Maritime flags